Susan Dungjen (born April 7, 1970) is an American former pair skater. With brother Jason Dungjen, she is the 1984 World Junior silver medalist and the 1985 U.S. pewter medalist. They won the silver medal at the 1983 NHK Trophy.

Competitive highlights
(with Jason Dungjen)

References

 Pairs on Ice: Dungjen & Dungjen
 

American female pair skaters
1970 births
Living people
World Junior Figure Skating Championships medalists
21st-century American women
20th-century American women